Fryxellodontidae is an extinct family of conodonts in the order Proconodontida.

Genera
Genera are:
 †Cristodus
 †Dzikodus
 †Fryxellodontus
 †Kallidontus
 †Polonodus

References

External links 

Proconodontida
Conodont families
Fossil taxa described in 1981